Symbiosis Skills and Professional University (formerly as Symbiosis Skills and Open University) Pune, Maharashtra, India. Established by the Symbiosis Open Education Society, Symbiosis Skills and Professional University is the first skill-building and development university in the state of Maharastra. On 3 May 2017, the state passed a legislation bill to enact this university. Presently, this university offers diplomas, degrees and certificates in various fields such as Automobile, Construction, Mechatronics, Software engineering, Computer science and IT, Beauty and Wellness, Data Science, Retail, Logistics and Ports as well as Architecture. The main objective of this university is to create industry-ready youth, who can work efficiently and effectively in an organization. Furthermore, SSPU has also built strong ties with many leading organizations for joint-curricula development. Some of the famous industry partners of this university are Shopper Stop, Daikin, LSC and Enrich. 

Symbiosis Skills and Professional University, [SSPU] Pune Schools:
School of Automobile Engineering,
School of Construction Engineering and Infrastructure Management,
School of Mechatronics Engineering,
School of Data Science,
School of Architecture, Urban Development and Planning,
School of Ports, Terminal Management and Logistics,
School of Retail Management,
School of Beauty and Wellness,
School of Data Science,
School of Interdisciplinary Science

References

</ref>

External links

Private universities in India
2017 establishments in Maharashtra
Universities and colleges in Maharashtra